Charlie and Marie Lupton Baseball Stadium and Williams-Reilly Field is a baseball stadium located on the campus of Texas Christian University (TCU) in Fort Worth, Texas. It has been the home field of the TCU Horned Frogs baseball team since its opening on February 2, 2003.

History
Lupton Stadium, the home of TCU Horned Frogs baseball, opened in 2003 and replaced the TCU Diamond, the Horned Frogs' home from 1962 to 2002. The TCU Diamond was adjacent to Amon G. Carter Stadium and Schollmaier Arena, where the Sam Baugh Indoor Practice Facility is now located.

The playing surface features the latest technology in field maintenance, including a Bermuda TIFF 419 surface. The dugouts are heated with Major League Baseball-style bat and helmet racks while a spacious home-and-visitor bullpen areas are located outside the field of play. The original $7 million stadium is a two-tiered complex with three suites, offices, two radio booths, press box, ticket office, home and visiting team locker rooms, and general player and fan facilities.

2009–10 Seating Expansion
In 2010, a $1 million project expanded upper-deck seating to bring the total capacity to 9,000 and added an auxiliary scoreboard along the first base line. Later, partially shaded party patios were constructed in the right field corner; these patios can be reserved by fans who may bring in food and beverages, including beer and wine, to the patios.

2014–15 Player Development Center Addition
Additions and renovations in 2014 and 2015 totaled $2.5 million and added the G. Malcolm Louden Player Development Center for Baseball, a 9,000 square-foot indoor/outdoor practice facility. The renovation added indoor batting cages and a field turf outdoor practice space, and moved the home bullpen to beyond the left-center field fence.

2015–16 Player, Coach & Alumni Facilities Additions
An $8 million construction and renovation project in 2015–16 added a new player facility on the third base line to house a new home team locker room, team lounge, sports medicine center, equipment room, team classroom, coaches' offices and an alumni locker room; this project also included the addition of a new 40' x 23' video scoreboard in left-center field and the installation of new outfield fences and a general-admission grass berm beyond the right field wall (photo gallery).

Future Renovations
An additional phase of stadium renovations is planned to renovate in-stadium fan amenities, including widening the stadium concourses, renovating suites, constructing new restrooms and concessions and renovating the main entrance.

TCU Baseball Attendance
Annual total and average attendance at Lupton Stadium attendance has steadily increased since the venue opened in 2003, from approximately 1,500 fans per game to over 4,000 fans per game. The increase in attendance has coincided with the Horned Frogs’ 2010, 2014, 2015 and 2016 College World Series appearances and the 2010 Lupton Stadium seating expansion.

Total and average attendance at Lupton Stadium has ranked in the top 15 for NCAA home games since TCU's 2011 season. In 2015, TCU and Lupton ranked 8th nationally in total attendance, 10th national in average attendance, and led all private schools in the nation in total and average attendance. 

The record attendance of 7,383 was set in 2015 when TCU hosted Texas A&M in a 3-game NCAA Super Regional, with each game's total attendance exceeding 7,000.

Other Events
In addition to serving as the home of TCU Horned Frogs baseball, Lupton Stadium hosts Jim Schlossnagle's baseball camps and other special events for high school and club teams annually.  The venue has also hosted the following Mountain West Conference tournaments, NCAA Regional tournaments and NCAA Super Regional tournaments:
 MWC baseball tournament: 2008, 2009
 NCAA Division I Baseball Tournament Regional: 2009, 2010, 2011, 2014, 2015, 2016, 2017, 2021
 NCAA Division I Baseball Tournament Super Regional: 2014, 2015, 2017

See also
 List of NCAA Division I baseball venues

References

TCU Horned Frogs baseball venues
College baseball venues in the United States
Baseball venues in the Dallas–Fort Worth metroplex
Baseball venues in Texas